Litvinovo is a rural locality (a village) in Kolchugino, Kolchuginsky District, Vladimir Oblast, Russia. The population was 192 as of 2010. There are 8 streets.

Geography 
Litvinovo is located on the Peksha River, 5 km northeast of Kolchugino (the district's administrative centre) by road. Dmitriyevsky Pogost is the nearest rural locality.

References 

Rural localities in Kolchuginsky District